Anderson is an unincorporated community in Scott County, in the U.S. state of Arkansas.

History
Anderson developed along the Arkansas Western Railroad line which was extended to that point in 1901.  A variant name is "Anderson Crossing".

References

Unincorporated communities in Arkansas
Unincorporated communities in Scott County, Arkansas